In differential geometry a Poisson supermanifold is a differential supermanifold M such that the supercommutative algebra of smooth functions over it (to clarify this: M is not a point set space and so, doesn't "really" exist, and really, this algebra is all we have),  is equipped with a bilinear map called the Poisson superbracket turning it into a Poisson superalgebra.

Every symplectic supermanifold is a Poisson supermanifold but not vice versa.

See also 
 Poisson manifold
 Poisson algebra
 Noncommutative geometry

Symplectic geometry